Jo Peignot (9 January 1901 - 10 March 1969) was a French actor. He was born in Paris and died in Argentan in France.

Biography 
Jo Peignot have his first role in 1955 with Jean Gabin in Razzia sur la chnouf.

Filmography

Cinema 
 1955 : Razzia sur la chnouf by Henri Decoin : the intermediary with the newspaper
 1956 : Gervaise by René Clément : Mr. Madinier
 1956 : La Loi des rues by Ralph Habib : Raymond
 1956 : Mitsou by Jacqueline Audry 
 1956 : Les Louves by Luis Saslavsky : the pharmacist
 1957 : Le rouge est mis by Gilles Grangier : Mimile
 1957 : Escapade by Ralph Habib 
 1957 : Méfiez-vous fillettes by Yves Allégret : Ralph
 1957 : Échec au porteur by Gilles Grangier : credited as Tréguennec but play Morigny
 1957 : Three Days to Live by Gilles Grangier

References

External links 
 

1901 births
1969 deaths
French male film actors
Male actors from Paris
French military personnel of World War II
20th-century French male actors